A list of films produced in France in 1913.

See also
 1913 in France

External links
 French films of 1913 at the Internet Movie Database

1913
Lists of 1913 films by country or language
Films